Alegre ma non troppo is a 1994 Spanish romance/comedy film directed by Fernando Colomo and starring Penélope Cruz and Jordi Mollà. It was set in Santander, Cantabria, Spain. It was nominated in 1995 for four awards and won two of them.

Plot
Pablo is a twenty-year-old man who wants to be a musician in order to be appreciated by his mother and find a male partner he can share his love with. He finds one, but because of his demanding behaviour, he is soon alone again. He tries to become a French horn player in the Youth Spain National Orchestra, but the examiner turns out to be his father, who's been living apart from his family and doesn't really accept Pablo's sexual trends. Once Pablo fails in his exam, he feels very depressed. When another French horn player from Valencia hasn't got a place to sleep, Pablo takes him home to his house. The next morning, however, he finds a girl named Salome inside of his bed.

Cast
 Penélope Cruz - Salome
 Pere Ponce - Pablo
 Óscar Ladoire - Pablo Padre
 Rosa Maria Sardà - Asun
 Jordi Mollà - Vicente
 Nathalie Seseña - Izaskun
 Edmon Colomer - Raimon
 Andoni Gracia - Pablo
 Boriana Borisova - Boriana Borisova
 Luis Ciges - Abuelo
 Lola Lemos - Abuela
 Jordi Milán - Psiquiatra
 Daniel Schopfer - James
 Ramón Lillo - Conductor

Awards
Fotogramas de Plata (1995)
Penélope Cruz - Nominated - Best Movie Actress (Mejor Actriz de Cine)
Goya Awards (1995)
Óscar Ladoire - Nominated - Best Supporting Actor (Mejor Actor de Reparto)
Paris Film Festival (1995)
Fernando Colomo - Award for "Special Jury Prize" - Won
Peñíscola Comedy Film Festival (1994)
Pere Ponce - Award for "Best actor" - Won
Fernando Colomo, Joaquín Oristrell - Award for "Best Screenplay" - Won

External links
 

Spanish romantic comedy films
1994 films
1990s Spanish-language films
1990s Spanish films
1994 romantic comedy films
Films directed by Fernando Colomo